James Mario Brovelli (born April 15, 1942) is the former men's basketball head coach of the University of San Francisco (USF) Dons and hall of fame player.

Biography
As a player Brovelli was a three-year letterman for USF, helping lead the Dons to the NCAA Western Regional in 1963 and 1964. He earned All-WCC honorable mention honors in 1964. Later, he was named the 1965 AAU Athlete of the Year.

He became the Dons head coach in 1984. Starting from scratch after USF's self-imposed three-year hiatus stemming from various NCAA recruiting violations incurred during the Quintin Dailey era, Brovelli led the Dons for ten seasons, including a 19-win campaign in 1993. His greatest victory as USF head coach came in 1988 when USF achieved a stunning upset of Digger Phelps and Notre Dame in front of a sellout crowd in USF's Memorial Gymnasium. He finished with 131 career victories at USF.

Prior to his USF stint he was the head coach for the University of San Diego Toreros from 1973 to 1984, successfully guiding their transition from NCAA Division II power to the Division I ranks. He took the Division II program to three NCAA Western Regionals, winning the championship in 1977–1978 and advancing to the Final Four while earning District VIII Coach of the Year honors. His final three years of coaching the Division II program saw the teams go 20–7, 22–7, and 19–7. Brovelli guided USD's move to the Division I West Coast Conference in 1979. His programs improved each year in the win column, and during his final year (1983–1984) at USD, he directed the Toreros to the program's first WCC championship and first appearance in the NCAA Division I Tournament. That season the Toreros finished 18–10 overall and 9–3 in league play, and Brovelli earned WCC Coach of the Year honors. At the time of his departure from San Diego he had 160 career victories and was the winningest men's basketball coach in USD history (since surpassed by Brad Holland).

After departing USF he was named Director of Player Development with the Denver Nuggets on February 1, 1996. Later that following season he added Assistant Coach duties for the Nuggets.

Brovelli joined long-time friend, Bernie Bickerstaff, in 1998–99 as assistant coach, and on April 6, 1999, was named interim head coach of the Washington Wizards. He coached the final 18 games of the 1999 lockout-shortened season.

He next coached the Sioux Falls Skyforce in the Continental Basketball Association from 1999–2000, where he led the 'Force to a record of 30–26 and a playoff appearance.

Brovelli then signed on as a scout with the NBA's Charlotte Bobcats.

He has also coached the Japanese National Team and was a volunteer coach for the Minnesota Timberwolves for a season, in addition to serving as a member of the NCAA Recruiting Committee and Academic Committee.

More recently he was named Director of Athletics at College of Marin, while simultaneously providing radio color commentary for the USF Dons men's basketball home games.

Personal life
Brovelli received his degree in Business Administration from the University of San Francisco in 1964 and his Masters from the University of the Pacific in 1966.

Brovelli is a long-time resident of San Rafael, CA with his wife, Nada. Their son, Mike (USF '95), was a Dons basketball standout, and their daughter, Michele (USD '96), was a Toreros basketball standout.

References

1942 births
Living people
American basketball scouts
American men's basketball players
Charlotte Bobcats scouts
College basketball announcers in the United States
College men's basketball head coaches in the United States
Continental Basketball Association coaches
Junior college athletic directors in the United States
San Francisco Dons men's basketball coaches
San Francisco Dons men's basketball players
Washington Wizards head coaches